Lesly de Sa (born 2 April 1993) is a Dutch professional footballer who most recently played as a winger for FC Tsarsko Selo Sofia. 

An Ajax youth product, he joined Go Ahead Eagles and Willem II on loan before signing with Slovak side Slovan Bratislava in 2016. After two years, of which he spent the second on loan with Oss, he was released. In 2020, he moved to Swedish club AFC Eskilstuna

Club career

Ajax
De Sa began his football career in the youth of SV Argon, from where he transferred to the youth squad of Ajax in 2002. He made his debut for the senior squad in a KNVB Cup match on 21 September 2011 against VV Noordwijk, replacing Aras Özbiliz and scoring his first goal in the 61st minute in a 3–1 away win for the Amsterdam side. Although he was included on a few squad lineups for league matches in the 2011–12 Eredivisie season, he did not make any appearances. Playing for Jong Ajax instead, it wasn't until the following season on 20 October 2012, that De Sa would come into action for the first team in a league match, making his Eredivisie debut in a game against Heracles Almelo, coming on in the 77th minute for Tobias Sana in the 3–3 away draw. His teammate Viktor Fischer made his league debut for the first team in the same match as well.

Starting the 2013–14 season with the reserves team Jong Ajax who had recently been promoted to the Dutch Eerste Divisie, De Sa made his first appearance of the season on 5 August 2013, starting on the right wing in the home match against Telstar, before being substituted off in the 76th minute for Marvin Höner in the 2–0 win at home, marking the reserves team's debut in the second tier of professional football in the Netherlands. He scored his first goal of the season for Jong Ajax on 26 August 2013 scoring the opener in the 1–1 draw at home against FC Emmen.

On 28 August 2013 he was called up to play for the first team in the Eredivisie home match against Go Ahead Eagles where he made his first appearance in the starting line up for the first team. Ajax won the match 6–0, with De Sa scoring the second goal for Ajax only two minutes after the first goal was put in its own net by one of Go Ahead Eagles defenders. Within 5 minutes Ajax scored two more goals to increase the lead by four, with De Sa assisting Kolbeinn Sigþórsson on his first of the two scored with a cross from the right side of the box. De Sa was then substituted off in the 69th minute of the match for Lucas Andersen. The following match saw De Sa starting on the right wing again in what would be his continental debut for the first team in the 2013–14 UEFA Champions League group stage match against A.C. Milan on 1 October 2013. The match ended in a 1–1 draw, with Lesley playing the first 64 minutes before being substituted once more for Lucas Andersen in the home match.

Loan to Go Ahead Eagles
De Sa spent the 2014–15 season on loan at Go Ahead Eagles, playing 16 matches and scoring once. He made his debut for the club on 10 August 2014 during the first round of the Eredivisie, at home against Groningen. De Sa scored the 2–0 goal in the 50th minute, after which Groningen mounted a comeback to win 3–2. Partly due to injuries, De Sa was unable to play for large parts of the season. Go Ahead finished the season in seventeenth place in the Eredivisie, which followed by relegation via the 2015 play-offs. On 13 May 2015, it was announced that Ajax were considering transfer-listing De Sa. After the season, the Slovakian club AS Trenčín showed interest in acquiring De Sa.

Loan to Willem II
On 22 June 2015, it was announced that De Sa was being sent on loan to Willem II together with Ruben Ligeon and Richairo Zivkovic. On 9 August 2015, De Sa made his official debut for the club in a match in the Eredivisie against Vitesse which ended in a 1–1 draw. He was in the starting lineup and was replaced by Justin Mathieu ten minutes before the final whistle. In a KNVB Cup match against the amateurs of DOVO, he scored his first official goal for the Tricolores. De Sa was responsible for the 3–0 final score just before time. He finished the season in sixteenth place with Willem II in the Eredivisie, after which the club forced survival in the league through the 2016 play-offs.

Slovan Bratislava
In May 2016, De Sa signed a four-year contract with Slovakian club Slovan Bratislava who incorporated him transfer-free after Ajax did not renew his contract. De Sa started the new season with Bratislava in a team with fellow countrymen Ruben Ligeon, Lorenzo Burnet, Mitchell Schet and Joeri de Kamps, among others. On 28 June 2016, De Sa made his official debut for Slovan. On that day, they played a match in the first qualifying round of the UEFA Europa League against Partizani Tirana, which finished in a 0–0 draw.

Oss, Eskilstuna and Tsarsko Selo
De Sa was sent on loan to FC Oss on 31 August 2017 for a season. He suffered a cruciate ligament injury in his knee in December 2017, which meant that he saw limited playing time in the second half of his stint in Oss. After his loan period ended, De Sa returned to Slovan Bratislava, where he was allowed to leave on a free transfer. After being without a club for a year and a half, he joined the Swedish club AFC Eskilstuna in February 2020, competing in the second-tier Superettan. In February 2021, De Sa moved to Bulgarian club Tsarsko Selo Sofia, after maintaining his fitness levels by practicing with SC Telstar.

International career
De Sa is of Angolan descent. On 27 November 2007, he made his international debut for the Netherlands at youth level playing for the Netherlands U-15 squad in a friendly match against Slovakia U-15. He scored his first international goal for Netherlands U15 two days later in another friendly match against Slovakia U-15 on 29 November 2007. That season De Sa went on two appear in three more friendly fixtures for Netherlands U-15. One against Belgium U-15, and two matches against Switzerland U-15. On 28 October 2008, he made his debut for the Netherlands U-16 in the 10th edition of the Tournoi de Val-de-Marne '08 in Paris, France, against Italy U-16. After his second appearance, a 1–0 away victory over the host nation France U-16, he then scored his first goal for the under-16 team in a match against Uruguay U-16 in the same tournament. He later appeared in two more friendly matches for Netherlands U-16 against both Ukraine U-16 and ireland U-16.

De Sa made his debut for the Netherlands U-17 on 22 September 2009 in a friendly match against France U-17. He played a significant role for the under-17 teams 2010 UEFA European Under-17 Football Championship campaign, making a total of six appearances, while also competing in the La Manga Cup in Murcia, Spain, where he scored his first goal against Denmark U-17 in the 2–1 loss.

On 27 November 2010, he made his debut for the under-18 team against Romania U-18, making two further appearances for the Netherlands U-18 that season. On 19 May 2011, he debuted for the Netherlands U-19 in a 2011 UEFA European Under-19 Championship qualification match against Israel U-19, making a total of six appearances in the Dutch U-19 qualifying campaign, also appearing in three friendly matches for the under-19 team that season.

Career statistics

Club

1 Includes UEFA Champions League and UEFA Europa League matches.

2 Includes Johan Cruijff Shield and Play-off matches.

References

External links
 Voetbal International profile 
 
 Netherlands U21 stats at OnsOranje

1993 births
Living people
People from Mijdrecht
Dutch people of Angolan descent
Association football midfielders
Dutch footballers
Dutch expatriate footballers
Netherlands under-21 international footballers
Netherlands youth international footballers
AFC Ajax players
Jong Ajax players
Go Ahead Eagles players
Willem II (football club) players
Eredivisie players
Eerste Divisie players
SV Argon players
ŠK Slovan Bratislava players
Slovak Super Liga players
TOP Oss players
AFC Eskilstuna players
FC Tsarsko Selo Sofia players
Superettan players
Expatriate footballers in Slovakia
Dutch expatriate sportspeople in Slovakia
Expatriate footballers in Sweden
Dutch expatriate sportspeople in Sweden
Expatriate footballers in Bulgaria
Dutch expatriate sportspeople in Bulgaria
Footballers from Utrecht (province)